Eddie B. Robinson Jr. (born April 19, 1976) is an American former professional basketball player.  A  shooting guard/small forward, he spent five seasons (1999–2004) in the National Basketball Association (NBA). In April 2017, Robinson was inducted into the NJCAA Hall of Fame in Las Vegas, Nevada.

Professional career

NBA years
After attending the University of Central Oklahoma, Robinson signed as an undrafted free agent with the NBA's Charlotte Hornets in 1999.  Known primarily for his leaping ability and athleticism, he averaged 7.2 points per game over two seasons as a reserve with the Hornets and attracted the attention of Chicago Bulls GM Jerry Krause, who felt that Robinson could become a star if given more playing time.  Krause signed Robinson to a 5-year, US$30 million contract in 2001.  In 2004, John Paxson, who replaced Krause as Bulls' general manager in 2003, convinced Bulls owner Jerry Reinsdorf to buy out the last two years of Robinson's contract. Robinson left the NBA and never returned.

D-League
On November 2, 2006 Robinson was selected by the Idaho Stampede with the 16th overall pick in the 2006 NBDL Draft. In the 2006-07 season Robinson averaged more than 15 points for the Idaho Stampede. After the season, he was released. On November 7, 2008, he was selected with the 14th pick in the fifth round of the 2008 NBA D-League Draft by the Albuquerque Thunderbirds. However, he did not come to a contract agreement.

NBL Canada
On September 19, 2011, it was announced that Robinson had signed with the Halifax Rainmen of the National Basketball League of Canada for the 2011-12 season.  However, he was placed in the injured reserve November 1. He played his first game with the Rainmen against the Oshawa Power on November 27, 2011. Robinson scored 18 points during his debut. He departed the team in January 2012.

Big3
In 2017, Robinson signed with the Killer 3's in Ice Cube's Big 3 Basketball League.

Coaching
 Robinson is a volunteer coach for the boys basketball team of Prince Andrew High School in Dartmouth, Nova Scotia.

Personal life
Robinson resides in Halifax with his wife Jillian and son. He settled into the area after playing for the Rainmen, got remarried and subsequently became a Canadian citizen; he is a dual citizen of Canada and the United States. He splits his time between Halifax and Houston, Texas where his sisters as well as his three other children from a previous marriage live.

Notes

External links
Career statistics at basketball-reference.com
"Robinson all but gone", October 2004 Chicago Sun-Times article by Lacy J. Banks

1976 births
Living people
African-American basketball players
American expatriate basketball people in Canada
American men's basketball players
Basketball players from Flint, Michigan
Big3 players
Central Oklahoma Bronchos men's basketball players
Charlotte Hornets players
Chicago Bulls players
Halifax Rainmen players
Idaho Stampede players
Shooting guards
Small forwards
Trinity Valley Cardinals men's basketball players
Undrafted National Basketball Association players
21st-century African-American sportspeople
20th-century African-American sportspeople
American men's 3x3 basketball players